Pawarkheda  is a village in the Narmadapuram tehsil of Narmadapuram district in the Indian state of Madhya Pradesh. It is 9 km from Itarsi, the major rail junction in India.

Demographics
As of 2001 India census, Pawarkheda had a population of 1,028 with 559 males and 469 females and 166 Households.

Multi-modal composite logistics hub 
Madhya Pradesh State Agricultural Marketing Board in association with Madhya Pradesh Warehousing and Logistics Corporation intends to set up Composite Logistics Hub. The project land is at Itarsi in an area of approximately 115 acres of land between National Highway No. 69 and Delhi-Mumbai Railway line next to Pawarkheda Railway Station.

See also
Itarsi
Bhopal
Narmadapuram
Madhya Pradesh

References

Villages in Narmadapuram district